Rogersville station is a railway station in Rogersville, New Brunswick, Canada. Rogersville is served by Via Rail's Montreal-Halifax train, the Ocean; it is staffed and wheelchair accessible. The station is a -storey wooden-framed yellow clapboard building with a hip roof, located at 11082 Rue Principale (Route 126).

External links

 Via Rail page for the Ocean

Via Rail stations in New Brunswick
Transport in Northumberland County, New Brunswick
Buildings and structures in Northumberland County, New Brunswick